Madhu is a term in Hindi-Urdu, Sanskrit, and other Indian languages for honey.

Madhu may also refer to:

 Madhu, in Hindu mythology, one of the asura brothers Madhu-Kaitabh, killed by Lord Vishnu
 Madhu (actor) (born 1933), prominent actor who has featured in many Malayalam movies in the past few decades
 K. Madhu, Indian film director who works in Malayalam cinema
 Shrine of Our Lady of Madhu, a prominent Roman Catholic shrine in Sri Lanka
 Madhu (Sri Lanka), a town in Sri Lanka where the Shrine of Our Lady of Madhu is located
 Madhu (1959 film), a Hindi film by director Gyan Mukherjee
 Madhu (2006 film), a Tamil film by director Thennarasu
 Madhu Forest, or Madhuvana, a dense forest in ancient northern India

See also 
 Madhoo (born 1972), Indian actress
 Madhur, a Nepalese, Hindi-Urdu and Marathi word that means "honey-sweet"
 Madhusudan (disambiguation)